Muthana is a small village in Trivandrum district, Kerala. The village comes under Chemmaruthy panchayat of Varkala Taluk.

References 

Villages in Thiruvananthapuram district